The Arlington Garden is a 3-acre (1.2 ha) botanical garden, located in Pasadena, California. It is Pasadena's only dedicated free public garden. The garden was designed by Mayita Dinos; planting was first begun in 2005.

History

In 1902, the businessman John Durand purchased the site. From then to 1964, the property was home to the renowned Durand Mansion. The mansion was purchased and demolished by Caltrans in 1964. Caltrans used the lot to store heavy equipment during the construction of the Long Beach Freeway (I-710) expansion. The three-acre lot remained vacant since 1967. In 2003, Caltrans leased the lot to the City of Pasadena for city purposes.

The garden is now maintained and supported by the nonprofit group Arlington Garden with help from local residents and volunteers, the Pasadena Beautiful Foundation, the Pasadena Public Works Department and Pasadena Water and Power.

Points of interest

The garden includes thousands of California-native plants such as poppies, sunflowers, cactus and succulents, orchards of orange and olive trees, and many more species. It also includes a variety of benches and tables, birdbaths and statuary.

On November 15, 2008, Yoko Ono's art installation Wish Tree for Pasadena were donated to Arlington Garden and permanently installed there.

On October 8, 2010, a classical seven circuit Labyrinth was built with the help of the Sophomores at Mayfield Senior School. It takes roughly five minutes slow walking to navigate the labyrinth.

Awards

Betty and Charles McKenney, co-founders of the garden, were honored as the 2008 Contemporary History Makers by Pasadena Museum of History.

The Arlington Garden received 2015 Best Public Garden Award, which was awarded by LA Weekly.

See also
 List of botanical gardens and arboretums in California
 Storrier-Stearns Japanese Garden is located across the street from the Arlington Garden.

References

External links
Official website
Pasadena's Arlington Garden

Tourist attractions in Pasadena, California
Botanical gardens in California
Culture of Pasadena, California